Originally, the St. Louis Blues aired their games on KPLR-TV and KMOX radio, with team patron Gus Kyle calling games alongside St Louis broadcasting legend Jack Buck. Buck elected to leave the booth after one season, though, and was replaced by another famed announcer in Dan Kelly. This setup—Kelly as commentator, with either Kyle, Bob Plager, or Noel Picard (whose heavy French-Canadian accent became famous, such as pronouncing owner Sid Salomon III "Sid the Turd" instead of "Third") joining as an analyst, simulcast on KMOX and KPLR—continued through the 1975–76 season, then simulcast on KMOX and KDNL-TV for the next three seasons. KMOX is a 50,000-watt clear-channel station that reaches almost all of North America at night, allowing Kelly to become a celebrity in both the United States and Canada. Indeed, many of the Blues' players liked the fact that their families could hear the games on KMOX.

From 1979 to 1981, the radio and television broadcasts were separated for the first time since the inaugural season, with Kelly doing the radio broadcasts and Eli Gold hired to do the television. Following the 1980–81 season, the television broadcasts moved from KDNL to NBC affiliate KSD-TV for the 1981–82 season, produced by Sports Network Incorporated (SNI), owned and operated by Greg Maracek who did the broadcasts with Channel 5 sportscaster Ron Jacober. The broadcasts failed to produce a profit and then returned to KPLR for the 1982 NHL playoffs and the 1982–83 season before returning to KDNL (currently St. Louis' ABC affiliate) for the 1983–84 season, the first under the ownership of Harry Ornest. The Blues skated back to KPLR 3 years later.

In 1985, Ornest, wanting more broadcast revenue, put the radio rights up for bid. A new company who had purchased KXOK won the bid for a three-year contract and Kelly moved over from KMOX to do the games on KXOK. However, the station was never financially competitive in the market. Additionally, fans complained they could not hear the station at night (it had to readjust its coverage due to a glut of clear-channels on adjacent frequencies). KXOK backed out of the contract after just 2 years, and the Blues immediately went back to KMOX, who held the rights until 2000. Dan Kelly continued to broadcast the games on radio but was diagnosed in the summer of 1988 with lung cancer and died on February 10, 1989. After his death, Ron Jacober (who had left Channel 5 to be KXOK's sports director in 1985 then left for KMOX in 1987) was hired as the radio play-by-play announcer for the remainder of the season, and John Kelly succeeded in that position. After Dan Kelly's death, Ken Wilson became the St. Louis Blues' TV play-by-play announcer alongside former Blues' players Joe Micheletti, Bruce Affleck, and Bernie Federko. During this time, from 1989 to 2000, more games began to be aired on Prime Sports Midwest, the forerunner to today's Bally Sports Midwest.

The long-term partnership between KMOX and the Blues had its problems, however, namely during spring when the ever-popular St. Louis Cardinals began their season. Blues games, many of which were crucial to playoff berths, would often be pre-empted for spring training coverage. Angry at having to play "second fiddle", the Blues elected to leave for KTRS in 2000. However, in an ironic twist the Cards purchased a controlling interest in KTRS in 2005, and once again preferred to air preseason baseball over regular season hockey. In response, the Blues moved back to KMOX starting in the 2006–07 season. The season of 2008–09 saw the Blues play their last game on KPLR, which had the rights since the 1986–87 season (except for the 1996–97 season on CBS affiliate KMOV), electing to move all their games to FS Midwest, starting with the 2009–10 season. The Cardinals moved back to KMOX in the 2011 season, with conflicting games moved to KYKY, an FM station owned by the same group as KMOX.

Since the 2019-20 preseason, WXOS (101 ESPN) has been the flagship radio station for the Blues. Chris Kerber and Joe Vitale are the current radio broadcast team. John Kelly (son of Dan), Darren Pang, and Bernie Federko handle television coverage, and Scott Warmann, Terry Yake and Jamie Rivers (pre-game and post-game shows).

Radio

Fill-ins

Play-by-play

Color commentary

Notes
During the 1968 playoffs, games were sent to WIBV for the entire playoffs with the exception of Game 4 of the Stanley Cup Finals. However, there was an ad for one game saying that KMOX would join the Blues game in the third period. KMOX however, did not even air playoff games on days when the Cardinals did not play. On April 13, Game 5 of the Flyers series was played at Philadelphia and could have been televised in St. Louis. However, Jay Randolph was covering the Masters golf tournament for CBS-TV and could not broadcast that game on television.
In 1988–89, during Dan Kelly's illness and eventual death, there were many different combinations used. In fact, one game KPLR used a split feed because Ken Wilson and John Kelly were not available, and they did not want Ron Jacober on a TV game. Rich Gould did the play-by-play for at least one game with Bruce Affleck.

Television

Notes
In 1967–68, KPLR did 11 TV games, 1 home and 10 away. On KMOX radio, Jack Buck did play-by-play, but between NFL football, some illness, and then leaving for Cardinals spring training, he missed quite a few games, being replaced by Jay Randolph, Gus Kyle (working alone), Stu Nahan and Gene Hart.
The 1968–69 and 1969–70 simulcasts were unusual in the sense that while Dan Kelly's play-by-play was on both, Gus Kyle's comments were on KMOX only, and Hal Kelly did TV color (in addition to filling in for his brother on play-by-play on occasion).
Noel Picard was the primary radio/TV analyst in 1973–74 and 1974–75, with Kyle returning in 1975–76; while Picard was the analyst, Kyle filled-in as play-by-play when needed.
Eli Gold did a separate TV feed in 1979–80 and mostly did games by himself but did have some injured players serve as analysts when available. The year before, the Blues still had a simulcast when games were on KDNL-TV. But with those games, only Dan Kelly's voice was heard. Kent Westling would talk with Dan Kelly on camera before the game and during the intermission but was not heard on the radio. There were a few times when Kelly was "on assignment", there was a separate TV feed with Westling doing the play-by-play and Bob Plager serving as analyst. The 1978–79 season was one of two seasons (1984–85 being the other) where there was not set analysts on broadcasts. Once Ken Wilson arrived on the scene, Kelly and Ken Wilson were the team for TV games.

References

External links
St. Louis Blues Broadcasters Join Together, I Still Want Ken Wilson
Blues broadcasters relish calling games in Final
Longtime Blues' Announcer Ken Wilson Fired
Video shows Blues radio broadcaster’s quiet and emotional celebration after huge win

 
broadcasters
Lists of National Hockey League broadcasters
Fox Sports Networks
Bally Sports